Albandi is one of 12 parishes (administrative divisions) in Carreño, a municipality within the province and autonomous community of Asturias, in northern Spain. 

The postal code is 33492.

Villages
 La Calera
 El Convento
 La Granda
 El Monte Calera
 El Monte Morís
 La Peruyera
 Rica 
 La Xana
 Xibares
 Caicorrida
 Poal de Albandi

Notable residents
 Margarita Landi (1918–2004), journalist

References

Parishes in Carreño